Vasily Bykov may refer to:

 Vasil Bykaŭ (1924–2003), Soviet Belarusian author

 Russian patrol boat Vasily Bykov, named after Vasily Ivanovich Bykov